Music Farm is a Korean pop record label, founded with the band Cherry Filter as a name of Farm Entertainment in 2002.

Background 
In 2001, producer Lee Guk-hyun met the modern rock group Cherry Filter in a live club at Hongdae 
and started the agency 'Farm Entertainment' by producing the band's 2nd album.
The album succeeded and the unknown band became one of the leader in K-pop modern rock scene.
The agency was expanded and produced the albums of Kim Jin Pyo, Kim Dong-ryool and other musicians and in 2005, the name was changed to Music Farm.
Recently John Park, the semi finalist of American Idol 9, joined the label.

Artists

Current

Groups
 Cherry Filter

Soloists
 Lee Juck
 Kim Dong-ryool
 John Park
 Kwak Jin-eon

Former
 Kim Jin Pyo
 Lee Sang-soon
 Cho Won-seon
 Jung Soon-yong

References

External links
 Music Farm official site
 

Electronic music record labels
South Korean independent record labels
Pop record labels
Labels distributed by Kakao M